The Sisters of the Precious Blood is a Roman Catholic female religious order founded in Grisons, Switzerland, in 1834 by Mother Maria Anna Brunner. Precious Blood Sisters form an active apostolic congregation with sisters currently serving in the United States, Chile, and Guatemala. The congregation's mission statement reads: "Urged by the redeeming love of Jesus the Christ and rooted in Eucharistic prayer, we Sisters of the Precious Blood proclaim God's love by being a life-giving, reconciling presence in our fractured world." Members of the community are called to live out Precious Blood Spirituality regardless of their chosen ministry or daily work. Sisters have served in education, pastoral ministry, health care, social services, and various other fields.

The Sisters of the Precious Blood is a shortened English translation of the Latin "Congregatio Pretiosissimi Sanguinis" (Congregation of the Sisters of the Precious Blood). Sisters use the post-nominal initials C.PP.S. after their names.

History

Mother Maria Anna Brunner was born on 1 October 1764, in Reckenkien, near Mümliswil-Ramiswil in the canton of Solothurn, Switzerland. A widowed mother of six children, she was known for baking bread and delivering it to the needy and caring for orphans. In 1832, her son Nicholas (Rev. Francis de Sales Brunner) bought Löwenberg Castle at Schluein, which had been abandoned for 30 years, to found a school for poor boys. The following year, both Maria Anna and Father Brunner spent a nine-month pilgrimage in Rome, where they were enrolled in the Archconfraternity of the Most Precious Blood. 

Upon their return to Löwenberg, two women hired at the castle were inspired to join Maria Anna for nighttime hours of adoration. Other women soon joined the original three, and in 1834 Maria Anna obtained permission from the Bishop of Chur to lead a communal life with her small group of women. The rule was founded on that of St. Benedict and approved by the bishop, the object of the community being the adoration of the Most Precious Blood and the education of youth, including the care of orphans and homeless or destitute girls. Mother Maria Anna Brunner died in 1836; Sister Clara Meisen then led them.

In 1838, Father Brunner made a second visit to Rome, where he entered the Congregation of the Most Precious Blood at Albano. After his novitiate, he returned and continued the work he had previously begun, but also started educating boys for the priesthood, to inaugurate a German province of the congregation. The sisters then became affiliated with the congregation of men.

America

In 1844, three Sisters of the Precious Blood came to the United States to minister to German immigrants in Ohio. Ten foundations of Precious Blood sisters, brothers, and priests were established in western Ohio and Jay County, Indiana. Besides providing food and clothing for themselves and other missionaries, they opened schools and orphanages and cared for the sick.

In 1846, a motherhouse was established at Maria Stein, Ohio, named after the Benedictine monastery Father Brunner had first joined. Brunner donated a painted depiction of the Miraculous Madonna of Mariastein to the convent. It is said that Brunner had it with him when crossing the English Channel in a sailing vessel and was miraculously saved from shipwreck in a bad storm. Today, the former convent at Maria Stein continues as a center of prayer and community events and houses a museum as well as the Shrine of the Holy Relics. The Maria Stein Convent complex is on the National Register of Historic Places.

In 1850, Löwenberg Castle was sold, and the rest of the sisters emigrated to Ohio. From the beginning, the sisters balanced adoration of the Precious Blood with teaching, partly in convent schools and partly in parishes founded by the Missionaries of the Precious Blood. They also were in charge of two orphanages, one in Dayton and one in Minster, Ohio. In 1886, Archbishop William Henry Elder found it advisable to revise the rule drawn up by Father Brunner to adapt it to altered conditions. This revision, besides extending the time of adoration through the day and night, increased the teaching force of the community, who were thus enabled to take charge of a more significant number of parochial schools. Also, in 1886, the sisters separated from the society of priests and made a separate congregation with a superior general under the jurisdiction of the Archbishop of Cincinnati.

In 1923, the congregation's motherhouse moved to Dayton, Ohio, where it remains.

Formation 
Prospective members engage in a formation process beginning as an inquirer when a woman discerns whether she feels called to religious life. Subsequent stages include discerner, candidate, novice, and professed.

Partner Communities 

 Adorers of the Blood of Christ
 Sisters of the Most Precious Blood, O'Fallon, Missouri
 Sisters of St. Mary of Oregon
 Missionaries of the Precious Blood

See also 

 Consecrated life
 Institutes of consecrated life
 Maria Stein, Ohio
 Land of the Cross-Tipped Churches
 Religious Institute (Catholic)

References

External links 

 Sisters of the Precious Blood website
Sisters of the Precious Blood vocations website
 Archdiocese of Cincinnati Office of Consecrated Life
 Not With Silver or Gold: A History of the Sisters Congregation of the Precious Blood 
 Maria Stein Shrine of the Holy Relics 

Catholic female orders and societies
Catholic Church in Switzerland
1834 establishments in Switzerland
Missionaries of the Precious Blood